Ghatal is a city and a municipality in Paschim Medinipur district, West Bengal, India. It is the headquarters of the Ghatal subdivision.

History

In ancient times, when Tamralipta was an active port, Ghatal had its own ‘Bandar’ (port), 3 km east of Ghatal PS, used for anchoring boats and ships with goods. Now, the place is the confluence of the Dwarakeswar, Shilabati, Damodar and Jhumi. Ghatal was famous for manufacturing of cotton goods, tussar silk, bell metal utensils etc., and the Dutch had a factory here. The activities continued until the early British period.

In the early British period, Ghatal PS and Chandrakona PS were a part of Jahanabad (later Arambagh) in Hooghly district and were transferred in 1872 to Midnapore district. These became a part of the newly formed Ghatal subdivision in 1876. Daspur PS became a part of it in 1877. Ghatal municipality was formed in 1869.

Geography

Location
It has an average elevation of 5 metres (16 feet).

Ghatal is a flood-prone area and in many years is flooded by the Shilabati River. The Shilabati River divides the city into two parts. Near Bandar shilabati and Darkeswar river join with the Rupnarayan river. The Ghatal Police station lies on the west bank of the river. There is one peculiar floating bridge on the river made by joining boats tied with rope from both sides in the banks, called "Bhasa Pool" (floating bridge). Also, one cement bridge is constructed on the main pitch road or State Highway 4 passing through Chandrakona Town, Ghatal, Daspur, and Mechogram.

Area overview
Ishwar Chandra Vidyasagar, scholar, social reformer and a key figure of the Bengal Renaissance, was born at Birsingha on 26 September 1820.

Ghatal subdivision, shown in the map alongside, has alluvial soils. Around 85% of the total cultivated area is cropped more than once. It has a density of population of 1,099 per km2, but being a small subdivision only a little over a fifth of the people in the district reside in this subdivision. 14.33% of the population lives in urban areas and 86.67% lives in the rural areas.

Note: The map alongside presents some of the notable locations in the subdivision. All places marked in the map are linked in the larger full screen map.

Demographics
As per 2011 Census of India, Ghatal had a total population of 54,591 of which 27,882 (51%) were males and 26,709 (49%) were females. Population in the age range 0–6 years was 5,399. The total number of literate persons in Ghatal was 44,016 (89.48% of the population over 6 years).

 India census, Ghatal had a population of 51,586. Males constitute 52% of the population and females 48%. Ghatal has an average literacy rate of 76%, higher than the national average of 59.5%: male literacy is 83%, and female literacy is 69%. In Ghatal, 11% of the population is under 6 years of age.

Civic administration

CD block HQ
The headquarters of Ghatal CD block is located at Ghatal.

Police station
Ghatal police station has jurisdiction over Ghatal and Kharar municipalities and Ghatal CD block.

Transportation
Ghatal is well connected by roads and highways with nearby cities like Kolkata, Howrah, Midnapore, Kanthi, Digha, Burdwan, Bankura. For local transportation buses (both state and private), minibusses, tempos and cycle-rickshaws are available. Panskura Railway Station is the nearest railway station. SH 4 passes through Ghatal.

Education
Ghatal Rabindra Satabarsiki Mahavidyalaya was established in 1961. Affiliated with the Vidyasagar University, it offers honors courses in Bengali, Sanskrit, English, Political Science, Philosophy, History, Physics, Chemistry, Mathematics, Computer Science, Zoology, Botany, Geography, Economics, and Accountancy; post graduate courses in Bengali, English, Sanskrit, History, Philosophy, and Mathematics, and general courses in arts, science, and commerce.

Ghatal Government Polytechnic, established in 2016, offers diploma courses in civil, mechanical, and electrical engineering.

Ghatal Vidyasagar High School is a Bengali-medium coeducational institution established in 1886. The school has facilities for teaching from class V to class XII. It has a library with 11,000 books, 26 computers and a playground. The school was founded by Iswar Chandra Vidyasagar.

Ghatal Basanta Kumari Girls High School is a Bengali-medium girls only institution established in 1957. The school has facilities for teaching from class V to class XII. It has a library with 2,000 books, 4 computers and a playground.

Ghatal Yogoda Satsanga Sri Yukteswar Vidyapith is a Bengali-medium coeducational institution established in 1958. The school has facilities for teaching from class V to class XII. It has a library with 3,200 books.

Culture
The common people of this area maintained a culture something different from other parts of the district in conducting and observing their way of work in rituals and customs. They cherish their customs. For example, the people celebrating the worship of Maa Sitala Buri and other Maa Sitalas in an around Ghatal Town used to carry hundreds of dhaks in procession and arrange open operas acting on the stage dragged and pushed by the men on pitch road running through the town.

Among many festivals in Ghatal Sishu Mela (around the month of February) is most popular. Many people of Ghatal town and its neighbouring blocks take part in the Sishu Mela. Vidyasagar Mela is also popular, which takes place in Birsingha (the birthplace of Iswarchandra Vidyasagar). The regular Bengali festivals like Durga Puja, Lakshmi Puja, Saraswati Puja and Kali Puja are well attended and observed with glorious themed pandals. Other common pujas in the worship of Sitala, Jagaddhatri, Holi, Janmastami, Bheema Puja, Jhulan also takes place.

Science exhibitions, seminars on science and literature, awareness programmes on health and agriculture are usually held in Ghatal Town hall. Besides that musical, dance and magic shows are also held in Ghatal Town hall.

The Visalaxmi temple at Barada and Khipteswari temple at Ghatal are the main tourist attractions. There is also the Kushpata Satsanga Ashram. Here one can see several temples of Anukul Thakur. There is a large prayer room for the common people. Every day a huge number of people go to the temple to worship GOD, spend some great time with their families, and enjoy the silence with beautiful greenery on the banks of the river Shilabati. There are many ashramas like Anukul Thakurer Satsanga ashram, Nigamanand er ashram, Ramkrishna Mission, and Swami Debananda ashram.

There is an Independent Short Film Production House Named Niltara Films. The Production house was established in 2018. It is situated on the riverside of Silaboti near the electric office. Niltara Films has made different kinds of Short films and got many awards. Their most remarkable Project is Joker (Short Film -2019), The Stranger (short film – 2020). And their upcoming short film is Laxmi The Curse. It will be released in 2021. Niltara Films is the first Film making production House at Ghatal.

Temples
David J. McCutchion mentions:
 The Vrindaban Chandra temple as a West Bengal nava-ratna with ridged rekha turrets, built in 1794, with rich terracotta façade, it measures 17’ 6” square. 
 The Ragunatha temple at Nimtala as a nava-ratna with smooth rekha turrets, built in 1801 with rich terracotta facade; measuring 20’ 11” x 19’ 8”.
 The Raghunatha temple as a small flat-roofed or chandni type, built in 1797, it has terracotta archway panels etc. 
 The Sridhara temple at Katan as a double storied flat roofed temple, the upper storey was added in 1885, with rich terracotta, measuring hh14’ 10” x 16’. 
 The Simhavahini temple as char-chala temple with a char-chala porch, built in 1490, with slight terracotta, measuring 13’ square + 8’ 9” square.

Ghatal picture gallery

Tourist spots

 Bhasapool (Polton Bridge) - Heritage of India
 Kushpata Satsanga Ashram of Anukul Thakur
 Visalaxmi Temple at Barada
 Birsingha - birthplace of Ishwar Chandra Vidyasagar
 Eco park- picnic destination
Birsingha Bhagabati Vidyalaya (H.S) - established by Pandit Ishwar Vidyasagar

Notable people
 Akinchan Chakrabarty, 18th-century Bengali poet

Healthcare
Ghatal Subdivisional Hospital functions with 200 beds.

Medical facilities
Medical facilities in the Ghatal subdivision are as follows:

Hospitals: (Name, location, beds) 
Ghatal Subdivisional Hospital, Ghatal (M), 200 beds

Rural hospitals: (Name, CD block, location, beds) 
Khirpai Rural Hospital, Chandrakona I CD block, Khirpai, 30 beds
Chandrakona Rural Hospital, Chandrakona II CD block, Chandrakona, 60 beds
Daspur Rural Hospital, Daspur I CD block, Daspur, 30 beds
Sonakhali Rural Hospital, Daspur II CD block, Sonakhali, 30 beds

Block primary health centres: (Name, CD block, location, beds)
Viidyasagar Block Primary Health Centre, Ghatal CD block, Birsingha, 10 beds

Primary health centres : (CD block-wise)(CD block, PHC location, beds)
Chandrakona I CD block: Ramjibanpur (10), Ramkrishnapur (PO Tatarpara) (10),  Mangrul (PO Goaldanga Mangrul) (10), Dingal (PO Dingal-Kumargeria) (10), Jara (2)
Chandrrakona II CD block: Basanchora (PO Chhatraganj) (10), Bhagabantapur (4), 
Ghatal CD block: Khasbarh (6), Natuk (10), 
Daspur I: Makrampur (PO Choto Makrampur) (4), Narajole (10), Sekenday (2)
Daspur II: Khukurda (10),  Nischintapur (6), Chaipat (6)

References

Bibliography

External links

 Ghatal website
 Official Daspur-II Block website
 Official Chandrakona-II Block website
 Paschim Medinipur District official website
 Purba Medinipur District official website
 Midnapore - website for East and West Midnapore

Cities and towns in Paschim Medinipur district
Cities in West Bengal